Francis Wall may refer to:

 Francis George Wall (1846–1946), Mormon pioneer
 Francis P. Wall, American football player and coach

See also 
 Frank Wall (disambiguation)